N-Methyl-2-methoxy-4,5-methylenedioxyamphetamine (methyl-MMDA-2; 6-methoxy-MDMA) is a psychedelic drug of the amphetamine class. It is the N-methylated derivative of MMDA-2, and it is also an analog of MDMA and 6-methyl-MDA.

Methyl-MMDA-2 was first synthesized by Alexander Shulgin and was described in his book PiHKAL. He states that it is essentially inactive at a dose of 70 mg, and he did not try any higher; however, Methyl-MMDA-2 is still likely to be active, perhaps in the 125-250 mg range. This reduction in hallucinogenic activity relative to MMDA-2 parallels that of MDA and MDMA, indicating that with phenethylamines, N-methylation substantially reduces 5-HT2A receptor affinity.

See also 
 MMDA-2
 MDMA
 6-Methyl-MDA

References

External links 
 Erowid - PiHKAL entry for Methyl-MMDA-2
 Isomerdesign - PiHKAL entry for Methyl-MMDA-2

Methamphetamines
Benzodioxoles
Serotonin receptor agonists